Arthur C. Ross (August 27, 1878 – July 25, 1916) was an American Negro league pitcher in the 1900s.

A native of Louisville, Kentucky, Ross played for the Leland Giants in 1903 and 1904. He died in Chicago, Illinois in 1916 at age 37.

References

External links
Baseball statistics and player information from Baseball-Reference Black Baseball Stats and Seamheads

1878 births
1916 deaths
Leland Giants players
Baseball pitchers
Baseball players from Louisville, Kentucky